Aptos High School is a comprehensive secondary school in Aptos, California, USA in the Pajaro Valley Unified School District. Aptos High serves the communities of Rio Del Mar, Corralitos, Seacliff, Seascape, La Selva Beach, Buena Vista and Watsonville.

Historically, Aptos has been one of the largest high schools in Santa Cruz County, but recently Watsonville High School and Pajaro Valley High School have surpassed its enrollment.

In addition to standard curriculum, Aptos High School offers video production, computer technology, and various other courses. Some of the music classes, such as guitar, were dropped due to cuts in the California school budget. Recently, however, music classes such as band and drumline have been reintroduced.

As of 2008 Aptos High School has a new Performing Arts Center, where school plays are performed. There are also two gymnasiums, used for multiple sports, such as basketball and volleyball, and baseball.

The campus included a popular disc golf course for many years, but it was shut down during the 2020 pandemic. 

In 2010, the Mariners hired Coach Randy Blankenship from Madera to be their new head football coach. Since then, the Mariners football team has been to the playoffs every year. They have won five consecutive league championship and three consecutive section championships. The Girls Cross Country team has won sixteen Central Coast Section titles and two CIF State Championships. The Girls Volleyball team has qualified for the section playoffs for the past 26 years in a row. The Girls Track & Field team owns the second longest dual-meet win streak in California history. Between 1996 and 2005, they won 118 consecutive dual meets.

Notable alumni
 Trent Dilfer, NFL football player, Super Bowl champion, Baltimore Ravens
 Estelí Gomez, Grammy Award winning singer
 Brett Gotcher, professional long distance runner
 Nikki Hiltz, professional runner
 Sam Kennedy, NFL football player, Super Bowl champion, San Francisco 49ers
 Jared Koenig, MLB pitcher, Oakland Athletics
 Randy Kramer, (baseball coach) MLB pitcher; professional baseball scout, Toronto Blue Jays
 Lisa Leuschner, professional musician and recording artist 
 Greg London, American singer 
 Donny McCaslin, professional jazz saxophonist and recording artist
 Peter Mel, professional surfer; BIG Wave-2X Maverick champion
 Marisa Miller, swimsuit model
 Robert Oberst, professional Strongman competitor
 Jennifer Palmieri, White House Communications Director
 Jeff Schalk, professional mountain bike racer
 Carlos Torres, pitcher in the San Francisco Giants organization

See also 
 Santa Cruz County high schools

References

External links 
 Official site

High schools in Santa Cruz County, California
Public high schools in California
1969 establishments in California
Educational institutions established in 1969